The Qualifying rounds for the UEFA Women's Euro 2013 determined which 11 teams joined Sweden, the hosts of the 2013 tournament, to play for the UEFA Women's Championship.

Tie breakers
If two or more teams are tied in points the tie breakers are in ascending order:
 Points in matches between tied teams
 superior goal difference in matches between tied teams
 higher number of goals scored in matches between tied teams
 higher number of goals scored away from home in matches between tied teams (not to be used in preliminary round ties)
If the number of tied teams is reduced now, tie breakers 1 to 4 are applied again to the still tied teams. Only then the next tie breakers are used
 superior goal difference in all matches
 higher number of goals scored in all matches
 position in the UEFA women’s national team coefficient ranking used for the group stage draw
 higher number of goals scored away from home in all matches (not to be used in preliminary round ties)

Preliminary round
Eight teams were divided into two groups of four. The two group winners qualified for the actual qualification round. The draw took place on 3 December 2010. The games were played from 3 to 8 March 2011. The hosts of the two one-venue preliminary round groups are indicated below in italics.

Group 1

Source: UEFA.com

Group 2

Source: UEFA.com

Qualification round
The two winners of the preliminary round will join the 36 top ranked nations, with the exception of already qualified Sweden, and play in four groups of five teams and three of six teams. The group winners and the best ranked runner-up qualified for the final tournament. The other six runners-up will play three two-legged playoffs with those winners also advancing to the final tournament. This stage will run from September 2011 to September 2012.

Seeding

Due to the risk of suspension by FIFA of the Bosnia and Herzegovina Football Federation (NFSBiH), Bosnia and Herzegovina have automatically been drawn in sixth position in Group 1 in order to avoid the possibility of a five-team group being reduced to four. The draw was made on March 14, 2011.

Group 1

The Poland–Russia match ended 0–2 originally but was awarded a 3–0 win for Russia by the UEFA.

Group 2

Spain's María Paz Vilas set a new competition record when she scored seven goals against Kazakhstan.

Group 3

Group 4

Group 5

Group 6

Group 7

Ranking of second-placed teams
The highest ranked second placed team from the groups qualify automatically for the tournament, while the remainder will enter the play-offs. As some groups contain six teams and some five, matches against the sixth-placed team in each group will not be included in this ranking. As a result, a total of eight matches played by each team will count toward the purpose of the second-placed ranking table.
The Netherlands finished as best runners-up.

Play-off round
The six teams advancing as runners-up were drawn against each other to qualify three team through a two legged play-off. The three nations with the highest UEFA coefficients were seeded and played their second leg at home. The draw took place on Friday, 21 September 2012, at 12:45 local time at the UEFA headquarters in Nyon, Switzerland.

The seeded teams were Iceland, Russia and Spain.

|}

First leg

Second leg

Spain won 4–3 on aggregate.

Russia won 3–1 on aggregate.

Iceland won 6–4 on aggregate.

Top goalscorers
The top scorers in UEFA Women's Euro 2013 qualifying are as follows:

References

External links
Women's Euro 2013 – UEFA Official Page

 
2013
UEFA
UEFA
UEFA Women's Euro 2013